This is the list of radio and television stations owned and operated by Manila Broadcasting Company.

MBC Radio stations in the Philippines
Note: all stations are licensed to MBC or its affiliate broadcast licensees (Philippine Broadcasting Corporation, Cebu Broadcasting Company and Pacific Broadcasting System)

DZRH Nationwide
*All provincial stations nationwide carrying DZRH via satellite.

 DZRH simulcast over DWRK 96.3 Easy Rock via Digital Radio subchannel 96.3-HD3 (HD Radio).

Love Radio

*Originating Stations of Love Radio Manila & Provincial

Aksyon Radyo

Yes The Best

Easy Rock

Radyo Natin

 Radyo Natin Nationwide simulcast over DWRK 96.3 Easy Rock via Digital Radio subchannel 96.3-HD2 (HD Radio).

Other stations

*Co-owned by MBC, but it is currently operated by other owners.
Temporary Broadcast in a Medium Power, the format of this station is EDM,Music.

TV Natin (DZRH News Television) Stations

Analog

Digital

 Note: TV Natin carries DZRH News Television programs.

Cable / Satellite TV channels
 DZRH News Television

Former stations

Hot FM
Note: Since 2016, most Hot FM stations under Radyo Natin Network were retired in favor of Radyo Natin brand.

References

Manila Broadcasting Company
Philippine television-related lists